Denys Kushnirov (born 12 December 1992 in Kryvyi Rih) is a Ukrainian sport shooter who competes in the men's 10 metre air pistol. At the 2012 Summer Olympics, he finished 18th in the qualifying round, failing to make the cut for the final.

References

External links
 
 

1992 births
Living people
Ukrainian male sport shooters
Sportspeople from Kryvyi Rih
Olympic shooters of Ukraine
Shooters at the 2012 Summer Olympics
Shooters at the 2010 Summer Youth Olympics
European Games competitors for Ukraine
Shooters at the 2015 European Games
Youth Olympic gold medalists for Ukraine
21st-century Ukrainian people